Jung–Seongdong A is a constituency of the National Assembly of South Korea. The constituency consists of part of Seongdong District, Seoul. As of 2016, 189,620 eligible voters were registered in the constituency.

List of members of the National Assembly

Election results

2020

2016

References 

Constituencies of the National Assembly (South Korea)